Filyakovo is a rural locality (a village) in Moseyevskoye Rural Settlement, Totemsky  District, Vologda Oblast, Russia. The population was 2 as of 2002.

Geography 
Filyakovo is located 36 km northwest of Totma (the district's administrative centre) by road. Kozhinskaya is the nearest rural locality.

References 

Rural localities in Tarnogsky District